Sebastian Osterloh (born February 20, 1983) is a German professional ice hockey defenceman. He is currently playing for ESV Kaufbeuren of the DEL2. He previously played with the Straubing Tigers in the Deutsche Eishockey Liga (DEL).

References

External links

1983 births
Living people
German ice hockey defencemen
Frankfurt Lions players
Kassel Huskies players
People from Kaufbeuren
Sportspeople from Swabia (Bavaria)
Straubing Tigers players
Grizzlys Wolfsburg players